Wires...and the Concept of Breathing is the first full-length album by American post-hardcore band A Skylit Drive. The album was released on May 21, 2008, on Tragic Hero Records. The album is noted for frequently referencing the popular video game series Final Fantasy. The band released videos for five of the tracks: "Wires...and the Concept of Breathing", "This Isn't the End", "Knights of the Round", "All It Takes for Your Dreams to Come True" and "I'm Not a Thief, I'm a Treasure Hunter". This is the first album to feature vocalist Michael Jagmin,  who joined the band in 2008.

Track listing

Personnel

A Skylit Drive
Michael "Jag" Jagmin - Clean vocals
Joey Wilson - Lead guitar
Nick Miller - Rhythm guitar
Brian White - unclean vocals, Bass
Cory La Quay - Drums, backing unclean vocals
Kyle Simmons - Keyboards, programming

Additional personnel
Zachary Ybarra  - Rhythm guitar fill in "Tracks 1-13".
Jonny Craig - Co-writer in "track 2".

Production and recording
 Jamie King – Producer
 Kit Walters – Producer, vocal production, mixing
 Al Jacobs - Assistant engineering
 Mitchell Marlow - Mastering, mixing

Artwork and design
 Phill Mamula - Art direction, photography

Chart positions

References

2008 debut albums
A Skylit Drive albums
Tragic Hero Records albums
Albums produced by Jamie King (record producer)